Jordon John Forster (born 23 September 1993) is a Scottish professional footballer who plays as a defender for Kelty Hearts. Forster has previously played for Hibernian, Berwick Rangers, East Fife, Plymouth Argyle, Cheltenham Town and Dundee.

Career
Forster was in the Celtic youth system, but moved to Hibernian in 2010 after he was advised by Celtic that he would be unlikely to earn a professional contract with them. Hibs loaned Forster to Berwick Rangers during the second half of the 2011–12 season. Forster and Hibs agreed a one-year contract in May 2012 and he was loaned to East Fife for the first part of the 2012–13 season.

Manager Pat Fenlon said that younger players, including Forster, would feature more in the 2013–14 season. Forster made his debut appearance for Hibs in a 2–1 win against Hearts on 12 May 2013. Fenlon praised the way that Forster had dealt with the physical presence that Hearts had in their attacking line. Forster also played in the 2013 Scottish Cup Final defeat by Celtic, replacing injured captain James McPake. He signed a new one-year contract with Hibs in June 2013. Six months later, Forster signed a contract with Hibs that is due to run until 2016.

On 12 January 2016, Forster moved on loan to Football League Two side Plymouth Argyle until the end of the season. After returning from Plymouth, Forster signed a two-year contract with Hibernian in July 2016. He helped them win the 2016–17 Scottish Championship and promotion to the Premiership.

Seeking more regular first team appearances, Forster moved to EFL League Two club Cheltenham Town in July 2017.

In June 2019, Forster signed with Dundee on a two-year deal with an option of a further year. He featured often early on in his first season, but frequent mistakes eventually cost him his place in the team for a while. Upon his return to the first team and forming a back 3 partnership with Christophe Berra and Josh Meekings, Forster quickly became a key player in for Dundee, helping the side to 5 consecutive clean sheets, as well as his first goal for the Dark Blues away to Queen of the South on 22 February 2020. The team's momentum was unfortunately cut short however by the COVID-19 pandemic. Forster would leave the club in April 2021.

In May 2021, Forster signed with Scottish League Two side Kelty Hearts. He would score his first goal for the club in a league match against Stirling Albion, and would score an own goal in the same game. Forster would be on the pitch for Kelty when they were confirmed as League Two champions.

Career statistics

Club

Honours
Hibernian
Scottish Championship: 2016–17
Kelty Hearts

 Scottish League Two: 2021–22

Notes

References

External links
Hibernian F.C. profile

1993 births
Living people
Footballers from Edinburgh
Scottish footballers
Association football central defenders
Celtic F.C. players
Hibernian F.C. players
Berwick Rangers F.C. players
East Fife F.C. players
Plymouth Argyle F.C. players
Scottish Premier League players
Scottish Football League players
Scottish Professional Football League players
English Football League players
Cheltenham Town F.C. players
Dundee F.C. players
Kelty Hearts F.C. players